On the night of March 16, 2016, a brawl broke out between players from the visiting Liaoning Flying Leopards and fans of the Sichuan Blue Whales after Game 3 of the Chinese Basketball Association Finals.  This accident happened outside the hotel where the Leopards were staying. The incident not only ruined the championship dreams of the Leopards, but gave a bad influence to Chinese basketball.

Background 
Game 3 of the CBA Finals was held in Chengdu on March 16, 2016, between the Liaoning Flying Leopards and Sichuan Blue Whales. The Sichuan team defeated the Liaoning team 109-104, and led the series 2-1.

The incident
After the game, Liaoning  Flying Leopards players took the bus to the hotel. Upon arriving at the hotel, there gathered a large number of Sichuan's and Liaoning's fans. Sichuan fans provoked and taunted Liaoning players. As a result, Liaoning and Sichuan fans began to have physical conflict.  Liaoning players He Tianju and Guo Ailun's families, who attended the match, were attacked and abused, which angered the Liaoning players, and they began fighting with Sichuan fans. Guo, He, and another Liaoning player Liu Zhixuan were injured in the incident, and He was diagnosed with a right hand fracture. After the incident, the Liaoning Flying Leopards team called the police. The whole incident lasted for about three minutes, and there was no security personnel.

The next morning the Liaoning team took the bus and left. They were absent at training before the next game, which some suspected as a strike. Despite the event, the 4th game of CBA Finals was conducted normally, Sichuan beat Liaoning team again with a score of 96-87, and led the series 3-1. Liaoning coach Guo Shiqiang disclosed after the game that Liaoning team players were recording statements for a whole day, just like criminals.

Aftermath 
The Chinese Basketball Association fined 150,000 yuan for the home team (Sichuan)'s league funds, and increased security presence inside and outside the arena. The finals would still go on regularly, and Sichuan won the finals.

References

Brawls in team sports
2015–16 Chinese Basketball Association season
Sports scandals in China
2016 in Chinese sport